Vicente Miera Campos (born 10 May 1940) is a Spanish retired football player and manager.

A former football defender, he appeared in 139 La Liga games over ten seasons and scored two goals, mainly at the service of Real Madrid. Later, he embarked on a managerial career which lasted more than 25 years, and included a brief spell with the Spain national team.

Playing career
Born in the neighbourhood of Nueva Montaña in Santander, Cantabria, Miera played for two seasons (one in each major division) for hometown's Racing de Santander, moving in 1961 to Real Madrid. Never an undisputed starter safe for the 1964–65 season, he was part of the latter club's squads as they conquered seven La Liga titles, adding the European Cup in 1966.

Miera moved to Sporting de Gijón in 1969, helping it promote to the top level in his first year and retiring the following season. He won his sole cap for Spain on 10 December 1961, in a 1–1 friendly draw in France.

Coaching career
A manager since 1974, Miera started at the professional level with Real Oviedo, suffering top flight relegation in his second year, then moved to neighbours Sporting where he would remain for five years, except for the 1979–80 campaign at RCD Español. He worked in both major divisions for more than 20 years, his last stop being Sevilla FC (second division, in 1997–98).

Having already served as assistant during four years, Miera was handed the reins of the national team in 1991, remaining there for seven months as the nation failed to qualify for UEFA Euro 1992. That summer he switched to the Olympic squad, leading them to the gold medal in Barcelona.

Honours

Player
Real Madrid
La Liga: 1961–62, 1962–63, 1963–64, 1964–65, 1966–67, 1967–68, 1968–69
Copa del Generalísimo: 1961–62
European Cup: 1965–66

Manager
Spain
Summer Olympic Games: 1992

References

External links
 
 
 

1940 births
Living people
Spanish footballers
Footballers from Santander, Spain
Association football defenders
La Liga players
Segunda División players
Racing de Santander players
Rayo Cantabria players
Real Madrid CF players
Sporting de Gijón players
Spain B international footballers
Spain international footballers
Spanish football managers
La Liga managers
Segunda División managers
UP Langreo managers
Real Oviedo managers
Sporting de Gijón managers
RCD Espanyol managers
Atlético Madrid managers
CD Tenerife managers
Racing de Santander managers
Sevilla FC managers
Spain national football team managers
Medalists at the 1992 Summer Olympics
Olympic gold medalists for Spain
Spanish Olympic coaches